Laccodiscus is a genus of flowering plants belonging to the family Sapindaceae.

Its native range is Nigeria to Western Central Tropical Africa.

Species:

Laccodiscus ferrugineus 
Laccodiscus klaineanus 
Laccodiscus pseudostipularis 
Laccodiscus spinulosodentatus

References

Sapindaceae
Sapindaceae genera